The 2017 Lotto Warsaw FIM Speedway Grand Prix of Poland was the second race of the 2017 Speedway Grand Prix season. It took place on May 13th at the Stadion Narodowy in Warsaw, Poland.

Riders 
The Speedway Grand Prix Commission nominated Przemysław Pawlicki as the wild card, and Krystian Pieszczek and Paweł Przedpełski both as Track Reserves.

Results 
The Grand Prix was won by Fredrik Lindgren, who beat Maciej Janowski, Jason Doyle and Martin Vaculík in the final. It was the second Grand Prix win of Lindgren's career, and was a result that took him to the top of the overall championship standings - 5 points clear of Doyle.

Heat details

Intermediate classification

References

See also 
 motorcycle speedway

Poland
Speedway Grand Prix
Sports competitions in Warsaw
Grand